Pontus Carlsson (born December 18, 1982) is a Swedish chess grandmaster.

Early life 
When Carlsson was one year old, his family died. He was subsequently adopted by a Swedish couple and it was his stepfather, Ingvar Carlsson (former chairman of the Swedish Chess Federation), who taught him the game of chess when he was 4.

He studied Spanish during the time he was based in Spain, playing in the chess league. Now he is fluent in Spanish (having earned a certificate).

He is a dual citizen of Sweden and Colombia.

Chess career 

Carlsson has represented his country since his school years and is now a member of the senior national team. He has spent most of his chess career traveling throughout Europe. His first international tournament of record was the under-10 European Championships in Rimavská Sobota.

Having a propensity for rapid chess, he has won the Swedish Tusenmannaschacket Rapid tournament three times, becoming the only player in its history to do so.

Carlsson also won a number of youth championships at the national and regional level. He played in his first national championship in 2001 at age 18 in his hometown of Linköping.

His performance stagnated from mid-2001 to mid-2005 due to losing small amounts of rating points in successive tournaments during that period. He attributed this delay to not playing enough tournaments and activating himself.

In 2007, Carlsson played for the Swedish national team in the 16th European Team Chess Championship and scored 6/9 without a loss. His performance rating was 2686, having faced strong opposition, including Dmitry Jakovenko and Mark Hebden. He was also a member of the national team at the 2006 37th Chess Olympiad in Turin (+3=1−2).

He plays for the Sollentuna SK chess club, with which he took part in the European club cups in 2002, 2005, and 2007. Beyond the Swedish league he has also played in the Spanish league and other tournaments in Spain.

Carlsson became an International Master and Grandmaster in three years. He achieved the IM title in August 2005, and the grandmaster title in October 2007 after earning four GM norms. This made him the 16th Swede to become a GM. He earned his first GM norm at the 2005 European Team Championship, his second at the Open de Tarragona (Spain), the third at the Torneig Internacional Ciutat de Sóller, and the fourth in the 3rd round at the European Club Cup.

Having received the Grandmaster title, he is to be elected into the Swedish Chess Academy. The Chess Academy is an organization of dignitaries and sponsors of chess, and all Swedish Grandmasters are members.

His long-term goal is reach the 2600 rating mark. He says that he is undergoing a serious training program, including both Mark Dvoretsky's Dvoretsky's Endgame Manual and New in Chess magazine as part of it.

Quotes
"The training that I have done this far have taken me to 2500, but in order to reach 2600 I need to work hard on my weaknesses."
"Before that I only played two or max three ELO tournaments per year. Between 2001 and 2004 I had problems to reach my normal playing strength during the tournaments since I was too rusty all the time. I always started the tournaments bad and then when I got warm and recovered, the tournament was over and it was a half year left to the next one. I had 2400 in 2001 and in 2004 I had 2360 after losing five ELO points in almost every tournament that I played during this period. Therefore I decided to activate myself and start to play more and a bit more serious."
"No I don't think so. I mean there are only two black GMs in the world and I'm the only one that plays in Europe so everyone knows who I am. It's not possible for me to hide!" (when asked if international opponents are surprised when placing his name and country with his face)

References

External links

Articles on Pontus Carlsson at the Chess Drum

1982 births
Living people
Swedish adoptees
Chess grandmasters
Swedish chess players
Swedish people of Colombian descent